Grant Barrett (born 1970) is an American lexicographer, specializing in slang, jargon and new usage, and the author and compiler of language-related books and dictionaries. He is a co-host and co-producer of the American weekly, hour-long public radio show and podcast A Way with Words. He has made regular appearances on Christopher Kimball's Milk Street Radio, is often consulted as a language commentator, and has written for The New York Times and The Washington Post, and served as a lexicographer for Oxford University Press and Cambridge University Press.

Education 

Grant holds a degree in French from Columbia University and has studied at the Université Paris Diderot and the University of Missouri-Columbia, where he was the editor in chief of the student newspaper, The Maneater (1990–91).

Career 
He was an early blogger with the website World New York, which has been archived by the Library of Congress as part of its September 11 Web archive to preserve the blog's collection of responses to the 9/11 attacks.

In 2007, following the retirement of Richard Lederer from the radio show A Way with Words, Barrett became a co-host and eventually a co-producer of the public radio show, which is broadcast nationally in the United States. He co-hosts the show with writer/public speaker Martha Barnette. The caller-based radio show takes a sociolinguistic perspective towards language.

Barnette, Barrett, and senior producer Stefanie Levine founded the 501(c)(3) organization Wayword, Inc., to fund and produce A Way with Words after KPBS-FM, which had originally produced it, withdrew support.

Barrett is the author of the books Perfect English Grammar (Zephyros Press, 2016) and The Official Dictionary of Unofficial English (McGraw Hill Professional, 2010). Perfect English Grammar is a 238-page book on writing and speaking the English language. The Official Dictionary of Unofficial English is based on his Double-Tongued Dictionary and World New York websites, and includes new and unusual words.

As an editor and lexicographer, he compiled the Oxford Dictionary of American Political Slang (Oxford University Press, 2004), originally titled Hatchet Jobs and Hardball: The Oxford Dictionary of American Political Slang, and the award-winning web site Double-Tongued Dictionary.

In 2008, he was an emcee in the finals of the American Crossword Puzzle Tournament alongside Merle Reagle.

He is the vice president of communications and technology for the American Dialect Society, a former member of the editorial review board for the academic journal American Speech, former contributor and editor of the journal's "Among the New Words" column, and a co-founder of the online dictionary Wordnik.

Between 2004 and 2014, Barrett created an annual words-of-the-year list which has been featured in The New York Times and The Dallas Morning News.

Barrett frequently comments on language matters in the popular press, as a radio and podcast guest, as a writer, and as a quoted source. He has been a frequent public speaker with his radio partner and on his own, including for TEDxAmericasFinestCity in 2011 and TEDxSDSU in 2012.

Besides the publications given above, he has also written for The Washington Post and The Malaysia Star.

Bibliography

Author 

 Perfect English Grammar (Zephyros Press, 2016)
 The Official Dictionary of Unofficial English (McGraw Hill Professional, 2010)
 Oxford Dictionary of American Political Slang (Oxford University Press, 2004)

Lexicographer 

 Cambridge Dictionary of American English (second edition, 2008)
 Cambridge Academic Content Dictionary (2008)
 Collins British English Advanced Dictionary (2008)
 Collins Cobuild English/Japanese Dictionary of Advanced English (2008)
 Collins Spanish Intermediate Dictionary (2008)
 Oxford American Writer’s Thesaurus (first edition, 2004)
 New Oxford American Dictionary (2001, first edition, and 2005, second edition)
 Concise Oxford American Thesaurus (2006)
 Concise Oxford American Dictionary (2006)

References

External links
 Personal website
 Grant Barrett's bio on the A Way with Words web site
 Interview in 3rd Monthly October 3, 2013

Barrett, Grant
Barrett, Grant
Barrett, Grant
Barrett, Grant
Barrett, Grant